Vani Vidyalaya high school and junior college is located in Mulund West, Mumbai headed by South Indians Organisation. It is one of the oldest junior college in Mulund area. The classes are taught in English. A highly qualified faculty of teachers are there in the school, science and commerce stream. The institution is equipped with a modern lab and a library. A ground is located just in front of the Institution. Mulund railway station is just  from this college. A new structure is currently under construction and is expected to complete over next 1-2 years.

References

External links
 
 Siovani Website

Universities and colleges in Mumbai
Schools in Mumbai